is a Japanese light novel series written by Sagu Aoyama and illustrated by Tinkle. ASCII Media Works have published eight volumes since June 2012 under their Dengeki Bunko imprint. The light novel has received a manga adaptation and a separate spin-off manga series titled Tenshi no 3P! no 3P!!. A 12-episode anime television series adaptation by Project No.9 aired between July and September 2017.

Plot
Kyō Nukui is a teenager who refuses to go to school, and spends his days composing songs and publishing them online. One day, he is approached by a trio of orphaned little girls who ask for his help to hold a performance at the church/orphanage where they live. Intrigued by their request and impressed with their skills, Kyō decides to help them.

Characters

The main protagonist of the series. A shut-in high schooler, he has a love for music and publishes his own songs online under the fake name of HibikiP.

Jun is the youngest of the band girls, and the guitarist. She is the most innocent and shyest one, having trouble to express herself.

The oldest girl of the band and the bassist, she takes it upon herself to lead the group and thus is mostly the one in-charge, addressing them as "little sisters".

Sora is the band's drummer and the second oldest of the trio. She is the most passive girl, always sleepy with a vacant expression on her face.

Kyō's little sister who usually berates him for his decision to not go to school, but loves to be by his side. She is also a classmate of Jun and the others and is a little jealous of them getting along with her brother.

One of Kyō's classmates and a childhood friend of his, she is also an orphan from Little Wing and acts as the girls' older sister. She secretly likes him and supports his efforts to return to school and reassume his student life.

A former priest who is the owner of the Little Wings Orphanage where the girls live.

Media

Print
Angel's 3Piece! is written by Sagu Aoyama and illustrated by Tinkle. Eleven volumes were released between June 10, 2012 and February 10, 2018 on ASCII Media Works' Dengeki Bunko imprint.

A manga adaptation illustrated by Yuzu Mizutani began serialization in ASCII Media Works' seinen manga magazine Dengeki G's Comic from the July 2014 issue. The first tankōbon volume was released on November 10, 2014; six volumes have been published as of September 8, 2017. A spin-off manga series titled Tenshi no 3P! no 3P!! illustrated by Omiya began serialization in ASCII Media Works' magazine Dengeki Moeoh from the December 2013 issue. The first volume of the spin-off manga was released on July 10, 2015.

Anime
A 12-episode anime television series adaptation by Project No.9 aired from July 10 to September 25, 2017. The series is directed by Shinsuke Yanagi, with scripts written by Gō Zappa and the music is composed by Akito Matsuda. Crunchyroll streamed the anime.

See also
Ro-Kyu-Bu! — Another light novel series by the same author.

Notes

References

External links
 

2017 anime television series debuts
2012 Japanese novels
Anime and manga based on light novels
ASCII Media Works manga
Crunchyroll anime
Discotek Media
Kadokawa Dwango franchises
Dengeki Bunko
Light novels
Music in anime and manga
Project No.9
Seinen manga